Chac-Xib-Chac (Maya Glyphs   
) is a figure in Maya mythology.  He was a ruler of Chichén Itzá. He probably ruled during the plot of Hunac Ceel. He is mentioned several times in the Chilam Balam of Chumayel. Chac-Xib-Chac was said by some scholars to be one of the names of the Red Bacab, and some experts believe that this may actually be the name of the red rain god who lived in the east.

References

Maya people
Chichen Itza
11th-century people
Maya rulers
11th-century monarchs in North America